Blood Simple is a 1984 American independent neo-noir crime film written, edited, produced, and directed by Joel and Ethan Coen, and starring John Getz, Frances McDormand, Dan Hedaya, and M. Emmet Walsh. Its plot follows a Texas bartender who finds himself in the midst of a murder plot when his boss discovers that he is having a love affair with his wife. It was the directorial debut of the Coens and the first major film of cinematographer Barry Sonnenfeld, who later became a director, as well as the feature-film debut of McDormand.

The film's title derives from the Dashiell Hammett novel Red Harvest (1929), in which the term "blood simple" describes the addled, fearful mind-set of people after prolonged immersion in violent situations. Stylistically, the film has been noted for its blending elements of neo-noir, pulp crime stories, and low-budget horror films. In 2001, a director's cut was released, the same year that it was ranked number 98 on AFI's 100 Years...100 Thrills.

Plot
Bartender Ray and housewife Abby are driving through a heavy downpour at night, discussing Abby's bad marriage to Ray's boss Julian Marty. After gradually admitting they are attracted to each other, they stop at a motel and have sex. Lorren Visser, a private detective, takes photos of the tryst and delivers them to Marty.

Abby grabs some belongings from home, including a small pistol Marty gifted to her, and warns Ray to stay away from the bar. Instead, Ray goes and asks Marty for his unpaid wages. Marty mocks Ray, predicting that Abby will betray him the way she did Marty and when confronted will say, "I haven't done anything funny."

The next morning Marty attempts to kidnap Abby from Ray's home, but she beats him up. Humiliated, he offers Visser $10,000 to kill the couple. Visser agrees and tells him to "go fishing" to establish an alibi. Visser breaks into Ray's home and steals Abby's gun. He presents photos of the couple's corpses to Marty as evidence. Marty goes to the bathroom to vomit and then opens the safe to give Visser his fee, surreptitiously placing one of the photos inside. Visser suddenly shoots Marty with Abby's gun, leaving it and taking the money. However, Visser doesn't realize his cigarette lighter is underneath the fish Marty caught on his trip.

It is then revealed that Visser doctored photos of the couple asleep to look as if he shot them. Ray, deciding to confront Marty about his wages again, returns to the bar and discovers his body, accidentally discharging Abby's gun when he steps on it. Assuming Abby had murdered Marty, Ray puts the gun in Marty's coat pocket and the body in the backseat of his car. While driving, he is shocked to discover that Marty is still alive, albeit barely. Ray drives into a field and begins to bury Marty in a shallow grave. Finding the gun, Marty takes aim and pulls the trigger three times, falling on an empty chamber each time. Ray gingerly takes the gun and finishes burying Marty as he screams in terror.

A distraught Ray goes to Abby's new apartment and tries to explain that he "cleaned it all up." She, unnerved by the blood on his clothes, says "I haven't done anything funny," which disturbs him further and leads to an argument. Visser calls the apartment but does not speak when Abby picks up; she assumes and tells Ray that it was Marty. Horrified, he drops the gun as he leaves. Later, he is confronted by Meurice, the other bartender, who tells him about a phone message Marty left regarding money stolen from the safe (Marty's cover story for the $10,000 he paid Visser). 

While burning the doctored photos, Visser realizes that Marty kept one and that he cannot find his lighter. Knowing these can implicate him, he returns to the bar and attempts to break into the safe, but is thwarted by the arrival of Abby, who thinks the damage to the safe was caused by Ray and starts to realize Marty might be dead. Later, she has a nightmare of Marty, warning her that Ray will kill her as well. She goes to confront Ray who, now thoroughly confused, tells her Marty was still alive when Ray buried him.

While Abby tells Meurice about her suspicions, Ray goes to the bar himself and, opening the safe, discovers the doctored photo. Believing Abby is in danger, he realizes someone is following him on the way to her apartment. When Abby arrives and discovers Ray sitting in the dark, she turns the lights on, thinking it will protect her from him. Visser, who is on a rooftop across the street with a rifle, shoots and kills Ray. Abby manages to smash the lightbulb with her shoes and hides in the bathroom. 

Entering the apartment, Visser searches Ray for the lighter (which was overlooked by everyone) and goes into the bathroom, only to find Abby has climbed out the window into the next apartment. When he reaches around to open the window she stabs him with Ray's knife, pinning his hand to the sill. As she backs away in shock, Visser empties his gun into the wall, then punches through it to remove the knife. Returning to the apartment, Abby picks up her gun and shoots Visser through the bathroom door. Abby says, "I'm not afraid of you, Marty." Visser, lying mortally wounded on the floor, bursts into laughter and responds, "Well, ma'am, if I see him, I'll sure give him the message."

Cast
 John Getz as Ray
 Frances McDormand as Abby
 Dan Hedaya as Julian Marty
 M. Emmet Walsh as Loren Visser
 Samm-Art Williams as Meurice

Production

Development
After writing the screenplay, the Coen brothers—neither of whom had any prior experience in filmmaking—shot a preemptive dummy theatrical trailer for the film, which showed "a man dragging a shovel alongside a car stopped in the middle of the road, back towards another man he was going to kill" and "a shot of backlit gun holes in a wall." The trailer featured actor Bruce Campbell, playing the Julian Marty role, and was shot by recent film school graduate Barry Sonnenfeld.

After completing the trailer, the Coens began exhibiting it with the hope of persuading investors to help fund the full-length feature film. Daniel Bacaner was one of the first people to invest money in the project. He also became its executive producer and introduced the Coens to other potential backers. The entire process of raising the necessary $1.5 million took a year.

Filming
The film was shot in several locations in the towns of Austin and Hutto, Texas over a period of 8 weeks in the fall of 1982. The film spent a year in postproduction and was completed by 1983.

Blood Simple was Frances McDormand's screen debut. All Coen brothers films are co-produced and co-directed by Joel and Ethan Coen, although Ethan was credited as the sole producer and Joel the sole director until 2004. The Coens share editing credit under the pseudonym Roderick Jaynes.

Reception and legacy

Critical response
While the film was only a modest box-office success, it was a huge critical success. It holds a 93% rating on Rotten Tomatoes based on 105 reviews, with an average rating of 8.3/10. The critical consensus reads: "Brutally violent and shockingly funny in equal measure, Blood Simple offers early evidence of the Coen Brothers' twisted sensibilities and filmmaking ingenuity." 

Pauline Kael negatively called it "a crude, ghoulish story with thriller themes".

Gene Siskel and Roger Ebert (the latter putting the film at #10 on his Top Ten list of 1985 and reviewed again on its 15th anniversary) each gave it a thumbs up on the movie review show  At the Movies.

Box office
The film grossed $2.7 million worldwide. Its first big public viewing was the USA Film Festival in Dallas, followed by the Sundance Film Festival, where it received the Grand Jury Prize. The brothers took the film to the Toronto Film Festival, Cannes, and the New York Film Festival. They were very proud of their film, particularly in light of having raised the funds using their self-made trailer.

Home media
The original MCA Home Video VHS tape and LaserDisc was released on October 10, 1985, with a 96-minute running time. The film was released on Universal Pictures Home Entertainment VHS tape for a second time in 1995 with a 99-minute run time. Unusual for such an exercise, the "Director's Cut" is some 3 minutes shorter than the original 1985 theatrical release. The Coens reduced the run time with tighter editing, shortening some shots and removing others altogether. Additionally, they resolved long-standing rights issues with the music; the original theatrical version of the film made prominent use of The Four Tops' "It's the Same Old Song" (1965); the Coens had replaced it with Neil Diamond's "I'm a Believer" (1966) for the 1995 U.S. home video edition on VHS. The Director's Cut reinstated the Four Tops track.

Universal Home Video released a DVD version of the film in 2001, and again in 2005 as part of a DVD box set titled The Coen Brothers Collection. A Blu-ray edition was released in 2011 by 20th Century Fox Home Entertainment.

In 2016, The Criterion Collection released the film on Blu-ray and DVD, featuring a new 4K digital transfer supervised and approved by Barry Sonnenfeld and the Coens, along with various new special features.

In popular culture
The film was referenced in a 1992 episode (Master Ninja II) of the cult satirical sci-fi TV series Mystery Science Theater 3000.

Accolades
Sundance Film Festival - Grand Jury Prize: U.S. Dramatic (1985)
1st Independent Spirit Awards - Best Director (tied with Martin Scorsese for After Hours) and Actor (M. Emmet Walsh)

Soundtrack

Carter Burwell wrote the Blood Simple score, the first of his collaborations with the Coen brothers.  Blood Simple was also the first feature-film score for Burwell, and after his work on this film, he became a much-in-demand composer in Hollywood.<ref name="Bur16">Greiving, Tom (2016). [https://www.npr.org/2016/02/07/465725552/love-the-music-of-coen-brothers-films-you-can-thank-carter-burwell  Love The Music of Coen Brothers Films?  You Can Thank Carter Burwell".]  Music News, National Public Radio (NPR), February 7, 2016.  Retrieved May 15, 2017.</ref>  By 2016, he had scored 16 of the Coen brothers' films.

The score for Blood Simple is a mix of solo piano and electronic ambient sounds. One track, "Monkey Chant", is based on kecak, the "Ramayana Monkey Chant" of Bali.

In 1987, seven selections from Burwell's Blood Simple score were released on a 17-track album that also features selections from the soundtrack of the Coens' next film, Raising Arizona (1987).Blood Simple selections on the 1987 album:
 "Crash and Burn" (2:40)
 "Blood Simple" (3:33)
 "Chain Gang" (4:47)
 "The March" (3:34)
 "Monkey Chant" (1:04)
 "The Shooting" (2:52)
 "Blood Simpler" (1:22)

Other songs from the film that are not on the album:
 "It's the Same Old Song", written by Eddie Holland, Lamont Dozier and Brian Holland, performed by The Four Tops (used three different times, two inside the bar and one for the end credits)The 10 best musical moments from Coen brothers films|Far Out Magazine
 "Louie Louie", written by Richard Berry, performed by Toots & the Maytals
 "The Lady in Red", written by M. Dixon and A. Wrubel, performed by Xavier Cugat and his Orchestra
 "Rogaciano"
 "He'll Have to Go", written by Joe Allison and Audrey Allison, arranged by Jim Roberge, performed by Joan Black
 "El Sueno", written by Camilo Namen, performed by Johnny Ventura y su Combo
 "Anahi" performed by Maria Luisa Buchino and her Llameros
 "Sweet Dreams", written by Don Gibson, performed by Patsy Cline.

 See also 

 A Simple Noodle Story, a 2009 Chinese language remake directed by Zhang Yimou.The Evil Dead'' - the 1981 Sam Raimi cult classic Joel edited

References

Sources

External links

 
 
 
 
 
 Blood Simple: “Down Here, You’re on Your Own” an essay by Nathaniel Rich at the Criterion Collection
 Investor trailer officially posted by Janus Films on Vimeo

1984 films
1980s crime thriller films
American independent films
1984 independent films
American crime thriller films
1980s English-language films
Films directed by the Coen brothers
Films set in Texas
Films shot in Texas
American neo-noir films
Sundance Film Festival award winners
Films shot in Austin, Texas
Films scored by Carter Burwell
1984 directorial debut films
1980s American films